10645 Brač, provisional designation , is a stony Eunomia asteroid from the central region of the asteroid belt, approximately 10 kilometers in diameter. It was discovered on 14 March 1999, by Croatian astronomer Korado Korlević at Višnjan Observatory, and named after the Croatian island of Brač.

Classification and orbit 
 
The asteroid is a member of the Eunomia family, a large group of S-type asteroids and the most prominent family in the intermediate main-belt. It orbits the Sun at a distance of 2.2–3.1 AU once every 4 years and 4 months (1,583 days). Its orbit has an eccentricity of 0.18 and an inclination of 13° with respect to the ecliptic. The first precovery was taken at the U.S. Goethe Link Observatory in 1962, extending the asteroid's observation arc by 37 years prior to discovery.

Physical characteristics 

In October 2014, photometric observations by Italian astronomer Silvano Casulli gave a rotational lightcurve with a period of  hours and a brightness amplitude of 0.31 in magnitude.

A large-scale survey by Pan-STARRS (PS1) assigns an LS-type, an intermediary spectral type between the common, stony S-types and the rather rare and reddish L-type asteroids.

Naming 

This minor planet was named after the Croatian island of Brač, the largest Dalmatian island in the Adriatic sea, and the place where the Blaca hermitage Observatory is located. The approved naming citation was published by the Minor Planet Center on 15 December 2005.

References

External links 
 Asteroid Lightcurve Database (LCDB), query form (info )
 Dictionary of Minor Planet Names, Google books
 Asteroids and comets rotation curves, CdR – Observatoire de Genève, Raoul Behrend
 Discovery Circumstances: Numbered Minor Planets (10001)-(15000) – Minor Planet Center
 
 

 

010645
Discoveries by Korado Korlević
Named minor planets
19990314